Alice Reagan is an American theater director.

She is an Assistant Professor of Professional Practice at Barnard College, Columbia University in New York, NY.

References

External links
 Website for Alice Reagan

Living people
American theatre directors
Women theatre directors
Barnard College faculty
Year of birth missing (living people)